A native of Chicago, Yamauchi is the product of a true "melting pot." The son of a second-generation Japanese-American father and Filipino mother, Yamauchi spent his childhood near the Loyola University campus on the North side. His interest in food came early, with the aromas and flavors of his mother’s cooking and the "exotic" flavors of Japanese cuisine from his father’s family—plus his own all-American love of "fast food," a weakness with him to this day.

At 11, Yamauchi moved with this family to Skokie, known for its large Jewish community. Living next door to a rabbi and his family, young Yamauchi would often visit there to turn on the home’s stove and electrical appliances for the family on the Sabbath, then return later to turn everything off. Along the way, he learned the flavors of yet another cuisine. From fifth grade on, Yamauchi enrolled in all the home economics and cooking classes available to him.

Yamauchi’s parents wanted him to pursue a career in music, and by the time he was 14 he was what one calls a virtuoso, touring the country with his high school orchestra. He also enjoys martial arts and at age 19 he placed third in the U.S. National Championships. 

With all of his life’s interests, his first love, cooking, called to him. After working in fast food places and TGIFridays, he enrolled in the Kendall Culinary College. Two years later he had his first "real" job at the North Shore Hilton Hotel. His real training, however, started when he joined the staff at Carlos’ Restaurant, a highly successful four-star restaurant, where he worked under French (and Great) chef Roland Liccioni.

Those were difficult years, he says, trying to learn all the basics of fine French cooking while awakening to the flavor combinations in the French tradition, and his own heritage. When Liccioni left Carlos’ to take over Le Francais, Yamauchi moved on to Le Mikado, an innovative spot where he tried his culinary wings. Don returned to Carlos Restaurant as sous chef under Gabriel Viti. When Viti left, Yamauchi took over as Executive Chef. 

Carlos Restaurant had a reputation for innovation and developing great chefs. Carlos Restaurant achieved four-star status, many honors and awards, including a "Top 25 Restaurants in the Nation" from Food & Wine Magazine. 

At Carlos Restaurant, Yamauchi also was named in the "Top Ten New Chefs in America" by Food & Wine Magazine. Another award - for the musician and martial artist who wanted to cook — was a Top Five Rising Chefs in America award nominated by the James Beard Society.

Then it was on to Gordon Restaurant with one of the most innovative restauranteurs in Chicago, Gordon Sinclair. When Gordon decided to close his namesake restaurant, Yamauchi went to Le Francais when Chef Jean Banchet retired. Yamauchi was selected personally by Great Chef Takashi Yagihashi to take over the kitchen at, Tribute Restaurant, in Farmington Hills, Michigan. 

After a successful run at Tribute, Yamauchi spent time at the MGM Grand Casino in Detroit Michigan as the Executive Chef at Michael Mina’s Bourbon Steak and Salt Water, Executive Chef at Motor City Casino, Belterra Park Casino in Cincinnati, Ameristar Casino in St. Louis Missouri, and Mountaintop Golf and Lake Club in Cashiers North Carolina. 
In December 2020, Don along with his wife Cleta, Jeramie, and Debra Campana opened 400 Rabbits on 975 Rabbit Road, Sanibel Florida. It was a 250-seat Mexican-inspired menu. The restaurant was well received and was busy. In September 2022, Hurricane Ian not only destroyed Sanibel but the restaurant as well. 

Currently, Don is the Executive Sous Chef at Palmetto Bluff in Bluffton South Carolina. Palmetto Bluff is a luxury private golf community. It sits on 20,000 acres. The Executive Chef, Rhy Waddington, focuses on local meats and seafood and works daily with Palmetto Bluff Farmer, Shane, and focuses on farm-to-table produce. A unique property that is one of a kind

Don and Cleta married in 2010 and have 5 children, Brett, Brooke, Sydney, Lindsey and Dylan

References

Year of birth missing (living people)
Living people
 Chefs from Chicago
American male chefs
Asian American chefs
American people of Japanese descent